Arnold Johan Ferdinand van Laer (21 October 1869, in Utrecht – 25 March 1955, in Albany, New York) was an archivist, translator, editor, and historian of Dutch-language documents from New Netherland and seventeenth century Albany, New York.

Career 
From 1887 until 1892 Van Laer studied in Delft. He emigrated to Albany, New York, in 1897, where he married Naomi van Deurs (1868–1930), with whom he had three sons. Van Laer became the archivist at the New York State Library at Albany.  He worked tirelessly the remainder of his life to translate and to reconstruct documents damaged in the New York State Capitol library fire of 25 March 1911.

References

External links 

 Bulletin of Information: Issues 91-96 - State Historical Society of Winconsin

1869 births
1955 deaths
American librarians
Dutch emigrants to the United States
Dutch librarians
Dutch–English translators
Writers from Utrecht (city)
Delft University of Technology alumni